Goniana is a Suburban town in Bathinda District in the Indian state of Punjab. It is located about 12 km from Bathinda City on National Highway 54 (NH 54)  It is also known as ‘’’Goniana Mandi’’’.

Demographics
Goniana Mandi is a suburb town of Bathinda city in the state of Punjab, India. The language spoken in this town is Punjabi. This is one of the growing towns in Bathinda district. According to the 2001 India census, Goniana Mandi had a population of 22012. Males constitute 52% of the population and females 48%. Goniana Mandi has an average literacy rate of 71%, which is higher than the national average of 69.5%: male literacy is 85%, and female literacy is 86%. In Goniana, 12% of the population is under 6 years of age. 

Several temples, widely known across the state, are located in Goniana; these include Tikana Bhai Jagta Ji Gurudwara, Durga Mata Temple,  Ichhapuran Hanumaan temple and Guru Ravidas Mandir.

See also
Bathinda
Punjab
India
Sikhism
Hinduism

Other Information

Notable people
Amrit Maan
Roop Records

References

Bathinda
Cities and towns in Bathinda district